The Nike Oregon Project was a group created by the American corporation Nike, established in Beaverton, Oregon in 2001.  The team folded on October 10, 2019 after an investigation resulted in a four-year ban of longtime coach Alberto Salazar.

Facilities
The runners lived in the Portland, Oregon area and trained at Nike's headquarters campus located just outside the Portland suburb of Beaverton, Oregon. Some of the runners in the group lived in a specially designed house where filters were used to remove oxygen from the air to simulate living at high elevation. Numerous studies have shown that living at altitude causes an athlete to develop more red blood cells, increasing athletic performance.

In addition to the simulated altitude training, program was used to monitor electrodes attached to the athletes, determining what condition they were in and how far or fast they could train. They used underwater and low-gravity treadmills, which allow athletes to run on a reduced percentage of their own body weight, resulting in less intense impact on the body than outdoor running. They also had a collaboration with Colorado Altitude Training (CAT), a company specializing in hypoxic athletic training, for their training equipment.

Creation
Nike's Oregon Project was created by Nike Vice President Thomas E. Clarke after he reportedly became dissatisfied with the performance of American athletes in long-distance events since the early 1980s. During that time, Alberto Salazar (later to become the Oregon Project head coach) had won three consecutive New York City Marathons in 1980, 1981, and 1982.

When the project first began, Salazar chose some of the top runners of the time that he believed had great potential. Eventually, however, he concluded that since these athletes were older, their training habits had become ingrained and difficult to overcome; this led Salazar to take on younger athletes instead. His new focus led Salazar to coach Matthew Centrowitz, Galen Rupp, and Adam and Kara Goucher. Salazar believes these athletes went on to more success because he was able to work with them from a younger age.

Athletes

 Galen Rupp 
 Jordan Hasay
 Shannon Rowbury
 Suguru Osako
 Craig Engels
 Clayton Murphy
 Eric Jenkins
 Sifan Hassan
 Yomif Kejelcha
 Donavan Brazier
 Konstanze Klosterhalfen
 Jessica Hull

 Mo Farah
 Cam Levins
 Dorian Ulrey
 Tara Erdmann
 Luke Puskedra
 Dathan Ritzenhein
 Mary Cain
 Treniere Moser
 Kara Goucher
 Adam Goucher
 Matthew Centrowitz, Jr.

Leadership
The health of coach and project director Alberto Salazar has been in question since he suffered a heart attack at Nike's Beaverton campus on June 30, 2007.  From that time, Salazar has been implanted with a defibrillator, and he planned to take a more limited role with Nike Oregon Project.  In June 2008, Salazar chose his tentative successor as head of the Oregon Project, hiring cross country coach Jerry Schumacher away from the University of Wisconsin–Madison.  In turn, Schumacher brought his top distance protégé, Matt Tegenkamp, with him to join the program along with Chris Solinsky and UW–Madison freshman turned pro Evan Jager.

Staff
 Alberto Salazar, Head Coach
 Pete Julian, Assistant Coach
 Dr. Darren Treasure, Ph.D.
 David McHenry, Physical Therapist

Criticisms

In 2002, the Oregon Project came under scrutiny from the United States Anti-Doping Agency (USADA), which formed a think tank to discuss the ethics of the high-altitude house. The Agency's Senior Managing Director, Larry Bowers said,  Alberto Salazar was confident the Anti-Doping Agency would ultimately approve the altitude house, saying that it's no different from other legal scientific advances like heart rate monitors and sports drinks.

In 2006, the subject was revisited more thoroughly by the World Anti-Doping Agency (WADA) which claimed that it could be equivalent to blood doping and therefore they should be banned; however, on September 16, 2006, Dick Pound of the WADA announced that "... the overwhelming consensus of our health, medicine and research committees – was that, at this time, it is not appropriate to do so." No explanation was given as to how WADA could possibly have enforced such a ban.

The Oregon Project has also been criticized by college track coaches for recruiting Galen Rupp directly out of high school to go live at the high-altitude house and forgo attending University of Oregon for his first year.

On May 19, 2017, The New York Times wrote an article about a leaked and unverified U.S. Anti-Doping Agency (USADA) report that claimed Salazar worked with athletes to increase their L-carnitine levels. The main accusation involved was that the intravenous method used could potentially have violated USADA anti-doping rules if the amount infused was too high.

On October 1, 2019, the USADA banned Alberto Salazar for 4 years due to allegations he "trafficked testosterone, infused a prohibited amount of L-carnitine and tried to tamper with doping controls." Salazar continues to deny the allegation and plans to appeal the ban.

On November 7, 2019, The New York Times released a video Op-Ed in which former Oregon Project athlete Mary Cain alleged that she suffered emotional and physical abuse at the hands of Alberto Salazar during her time at the project.  Cain claimed that she was pressured to take illegal diuretics and shamed about her weight to the point of self-harm and suicidal thoughts.  In a statement, Salazar denied most of the allegations.  Nike also made an official statement challenging the allegations, citing Cain's desire to rejoin the team in April 2019.

Closure of the Nike Oregon Project 
On October 10, 2019, Nike announced that they would be closing down the Nike Oregon project.  The CEO of Nike, Mark Parker, reported that the situation surrounding the actions of Alberto Salazar were distracting for the athletes and compromising their ability to focus on their training and competition needs. The current runners involved in the project would be assisted by Nike to find alternative training arrangements.

References

External links
  (archived, 20 Sep 2019)

Track and field clubs in the United States
O
Sports in Oregon
Beaverton, Oregon
2001 establishments in Oregon
2019 disestablishments in Oregon
Organizations disestablished in 2019